Essex Park is a municipal park in Montclair, in Essex County, New Jersey, United States.

Facilities
Essex Park is mostly occupied by sports and recreational facilities. These facilities are used often by the Montclair High School's gym classes and athletic teams and are closed to the public at some times. It has:
 a Swimming pool
 a soccer field made of artificial turf
 a quarter mile running track
 an ice skating rink
 a football field made of artificial turf
 three baseball fields
 a field house with locker rooms and bathrooms, et.c.
 a playground
 bleacher seating
 footpaths/bikeways
 benches and tables
 a small sledding hill
 open field space

Location
Essex Park is in central Montclair.  It is bordered on the west side by New Jersey Transit's Montclair-Boonton Line, on the north by Champlain Terrace, on the east by Essex Avenue, and comes to a point in the south next to the Walnut Street station.  Going through it is Chestnut Street, separating the Pool, playground, and skating rink from the rest of the park.

Parking Issues
For football games, spectators would park along Essex Street, often breaking laws by blocking corners, driveways, fire hydrants, even streets.  At one point a fire truck was parked in front of a driveway and was asked to move, which it did, to a 'no parking' sign. This was protested by local residents and a decision by the Montclair Town Council banned parking on parks of Essex Street.  For the Ice rink and pool, signs direct motorists to a parking lot which connects to a parking lot of the Walnut Street Railway Station.

Playground
A small, densely wooded playground abuts Essex Park's public pool and ice rink. The playground has swings and numerous jungle gyms for children ages 3 and up. Approximately 15 picnic tables are available for public use.

Ice Rink Privatization
In 2008, the township of Montclair was looking for ways to lower its budget and as part of a series of budget cuts and cancellations decided that the ice rink at Essex Park, the Clary Anderson Arena, should be privatized.  Montclair residents worried that entry fees might increase and that the quality of service would go down, and the township decided to retain authority in some way over the rink while having it operated privately.

The operation of the arena was taken over by a company called United Skates of America in September 2008

References

External links
RinkAtlas listing for Clary Anderson Arena

Montclair, New Jersey
Parks in Essex County, New Jersey